Alberto Álvaro Perea Correoso (born 19 December 1990) is a Spanish footballer who plays as a right winger for Granada CF.

Club career
Born in Albacete, Castile-La Mancha, Perea was a product of hometown Albacete Balompié's youth ranks. He made his debut with the first team on 17 January 2009, coming on as a second-half substitute in a 0–3 home defeat to Hércules CF in the Segunda División. On 21 May he was transferred to Atlético Madrid, spending his first season with the Colchoneros' B team in the Segunda División B.

Good form earned Perea a promotion to the first team for the 2010–11 pre-season, scoring in his first appearance with the main squad against Madrid neighbours RSD Alcalá (8–2 win), and against Real Betis (2–1) the following week. On 27 October 2010 he played his first official game for Atlético, replacing Raúl García in a 5–0 victory at Universidad de Las Palmas CF in the round of 32 of the Copa del Rey. Two weeks later, as everything was already decided, he started in the second match, a 1–1 draw at the Vicente Calderón Stadium.

On 12 July 2011, Perea transferred to another side in the Community of Madrid, signing a three-year deal with Rayo Vallecano, recently returned to La Liga, and initially being assigned to the B side in division three. Benefitting from several injuries to the main squad, he made his debut in the top flight on 22 January 2012, playing ten minutes in a 1–0 home loss against RCD Mallorca.

Perea alternated between the second and third tiers in the following years, representing UE Llagostera, UE Olot and FC Barcelona B. On 17 July 2017, the free agent signed a three-year contract with Cádiz CF in the former tournament.

On 1 February 2019, Perea was loaned to Extremadura UD for six months. He renewed his link at the Estadio Ramón de Carranza until 30 June 2023 later the same year, commenting on the new deal by making a nod to club legend Mágico González: "Carranza is a land of magicians, and I want to offer my magic until 2023". 

On 1 September 2022, Perea terminated his contract with Cádiz, and signed a one-year deal with Granada CF hours later.

Career statistics

References

External links

1990 births
Living people
Sportspeople from Albacete
Spanish footballers
Footballers from Castilla–La Mancha
Association football wingers
La Liga players
Segunda División players
Segunda División B players
Albacete Balompié players
Atlético Madrid B players
Atlético Madrid footballers
Rayo Vallecano B players
Rayo Vallecano players
UE Costa Brava players
UE Olot players
FC Barcelona Atlètic players
Cádiz CF players
Extremadura UD footballers
Granada CF footballers